Follet may refer to:

Surname:
Michel Follet (born 1959), Flemish radio and TV host and a film critic
Nelson le Follet, stage name of Bartolomeo Viganego (1859–1943), Italian illusionist, impersonator and acrobat
René Follet (1931–2020), Belgian illustrator, comics writer and artist
Simone Follet (1935–2021), French epigrapher and scholar of Roman Athens

Given name:
Dewey Follet Bartlett (1919–1979), American politician, 19th Governor of Oklahoma from 1967 to 1971
Clyde Follet Seavey (1904–1991), American artist

Feu:
Feu follet the Brazilian equivalent of the will-o'-the-wisp
Le Feu follet (The Fire Within), a 1963 French drama film directed by Louis Malle
Le feu follet (novel), a 1931 novel by the French writer Pierre Drieu La Rochelle

Other:
Le Follet, Parisian fashion magazine, published weekly from November 1829 to 1892
French submarine Follet (Q7), early submarine built for the French Navy at the beginning of the 20th century

See also
Follett (disambiguation)
Fallet (disambiguation)
Fauillet
Feuillet (disambiguation)